The Falcon and the Snowman is the soundtrack to the film of the same name and was composed and produced by Pat Metheny and Lyle Mays. It includes the song "This Is Not America", a major hit sung by David Bowie. The music is performed by the Pat Metheny Group with occasional orchestra and choir.

Track listing
All songs written by Pat Metheny and Lyle Mays except "This Is Not America", lyrics by David Bowie.

Personnel
 Pat Metheny – acoustic and electric guitars, guitar synthesizer
 Lyle Mays – piano, synthesizers
 Steve Rodby – acoustic and electric bass
 Paul Wertico – drums, percussion
 Pedro Aznar – vocals on "Daulton Lee" and "The Falcon"
 David Bowie – vocals and lyrics on "This Is Not America"
 National Philharmonic Orchestra (conducted by Steve Rodby) on "Flight of the Falcon", "Extent of the Lie", "The Level of Deception", and "Capture"
 Ambrosian Choir (conducted by John McCarthy) on "Psalm 121" and "Epilogue (Psalm 121)"

References

Pat Metheny albums
1980s film soundtrack albums
1985 soundtrack albums
EMI Records soundtracks